Highway 1 (AR 1, Ark. 1, and Hwy. 1) is a north–south state highway in east Arkansas. The route of  runs from US Route 278 (US 278) in McGehee north to Supplemental Route BB at the Missouri state line. One of the original 1926 state highways, Highway 1 has remained very close to its original routing.

Route description

McGehee to Back Gate
Arkansas Highway 1 begins at U.S. Route 278 in downtown McGehee and runs northwest (along the Union Pacific Railroad tracks) for three blocks before turning northeast at an intersection with AR 159. The highway continues across US 65/US 165 and exits town in a northeastern direction, passing McGehee High School. AR 1 meets Arkansas Highway 4, which runs south to Arkansas City before curving north to Rohwer, which was a Japanese American internment camp during World War II. AR 1 passes the Kemp Cotton Gin Historic District, Rowher Relocation Center, and Rohwer Relocation Center Memorial Cemetery. Continuing north, AR 1 ceases following the railroad at Watson and runs west to Back Gate, where a concurrency with US 165 begins.

DeWitt to Wynne

Entering Arkansas County, the routes pass through Gillett and rural Arkansas County. In south De Witt AR 1 splits east from US 165 and AR 1 Business. AR 1 bypasses southeast De Witt, and after reconnecting with AR 1B continues northeast. AR 1 runs east through St. Charles before entering Monroe County. AR 1 Spur enters St. Charles, and terminates near the site of the Battle of Saint Charles on the White River.

Arkansas Highway 1 enters southern Monroe County briefly. At Cross Roads, AR 1 is the southern terminus of AR 17. On the Monroe/Phillips County line, AR 1 has a junction with Arkansas Highway 39 and Arkansas Highway 316. The route continues northeast to Marvell, where AR 1 concurs with U.S. Route 49 east to Walnut Corner. At the corner, AR 1 turns north past the Richardson-Turner House and enters Lee County. The route has a junction with AR 121 at Cypress Corner and continues north to Marianna.

In Marianna, Highway 1 breaks west from AR 1 Business, which runs downtown through Marianna. After AR 1B rejoins the main route, there is a  concurrency north with U.S. Route 79. Further north, AR 1 passes Lee County Senior High and becomes four lane briefly until Forrest City. Upon entering St. Francis County, AR 1 enters Forrest City. The business route runs downtown, while the main route skirts the southwest edge of town. There is a parclo interchange with U.S. Route 70 and an interchange with Interstate 40. The business route meets AR 1 in north Forrest City, and AR 1 enters Caldwell and Colt before entering Cross County. South of Caldwell, AR 1 is near the historic Little Telico Creek Bridge, listed on the National Register of Historic Places.

Wynne to Missouri
AR 1 enters Wynne in Cross County. The highway has a junction with US 64, AR 284, AR 980, and US 64 Business, and also passes near Wynne High School. The highway continues north to Vanndale and Cherry Valley before entering Poinsett County. The route passes through marshes in southern Poinsett County before entering Harrisburg. AR 1 passes the Bacon Hotel in south Poinsett County near Whitehall, and also passes the historic Modern News Building in downtown Harrisburg.

Entering Craighead County, AR 1 enters Jonesboro from the south. After intersecting AR 163, the route intersects Interstate 555 (concurrent at that freeway portion with US 49). Highway 1 becomes concurrent north with US 49 (and later US 62) until Piggott

The route leaves US 62 (Crowley's Ridge Parkway) in Piggott and runs east to Missouri supplemental route BB near Holcomb, Missouri, where the route terminates.

History

The route now known as AR 1 first appears as a state highway in 1924, when the Arkansas General Assembly first created a state highway system. Arkansas State Road B-1 ran from the Louisiana state line near Wilmot north into Missouri, and was mostly unpaved. Upon creation of the U.S. Route system in 1925, the north and south portions of the highway were replaced by U.S. Route 67 and U.S. Route 165, respectively, shaping a more familiar AR 1 routing. Arkansas followed the trend to number in 1926, and B-1 became Arkansas Highway 1. The route remains very true to that original course today. The route was split apart in 1941 into AR 1 East and AR 1 West segments from Paragould north. AR 1 East continued north through Marmaduke and Rector. AR 1 West traveled into Corning. By 1955, AR 1W became Arkansas Highway 135, and AR 1E became AR 1. US 49 overlapped Highway 1 from Jonesboro to Piggott in 1978.

Major intersections

Mile markers reset at concurrencies.

Business routes

Arkansas Highway 1 has six business routes and one spur route. As cities have grown, bypasses have become necessary, and the former downtown alignments of AR 1 have become the business routes discussed here. The St. Charles spur route terminates at the site of the Civil War Battle of Saint Charles upon the White River. The Forrest City business route intersects major routes U.S. Route 70 and Interstate 40. The Jonesboro business route is the longest, and intersects Interstate 555.

A former Paragould connector route, Highway 1Y, was created in 1968 and now carries a US Highway 49Y designation.

See also

 List of state highways in Arkansas
 List of highways numbered 1

References

External links

Crowley's Ridge Parkway
001
Transportation in Clay County, Arkansas
Transportation in Craighead County, Arkansas
Transportation in Poinsett County, Arkansas
Transportation in Cross County, Arkansas
Transportation in St. Francis County, Arkansas
Transportation in Lee County, Arkansas
Transportation in Phillips County, Arkansas
Transportation in Arkansas County, Arkansas
Transportation in Desha County, Arkansas
Transportation in Monroe County, Arkansas
Transportation in Greene County, Arkansas
001
U.S. Route 67